kuualoha hoomanawanui is a Native Hawaiian author who is known for her scholarship on Pele.

Early life and education 
Born in Kailua, Oʻahu, hoʻomanawanui also spent part of her childhood on Kauaʻi at Wailua Homesteads. Attending the University of Hawaiʻi at Mānoa as an undergraduate, hoʻomanawanui earned her B.A. in Hawaiian Studies, an M.A. in Polynesian Religion, and PhD in English literature at the university. While in graduate school, hoʻomanawanui was a founding editor of ʻŌiwi: A Native Hawaiian Journal. She became the chief editor after the passing of Mahealani Dudoit.

Career 
hoʻomanawanui has been a full professor with the University of Hawaiʻi at Mānoa since 2007, teaching Native Hawaiian literature and Pacific (Oceanic) literature. Her focus is on moʻolelo, especially the legends of the Hawaiian goddess Pele. hoʻomanawanui is the first Native Hawaiian with a tenure track position in the Department of English at the University of Hawaiʻi. Her work received an honorable mention for the Modern Language Association Prize for Studies in Native American Literatures, Cultures, and Languages.

Bibliography

References 

Native Hawaiian writers
University of Hawaiʻi at Mānoa alumni
University of Hawaiʻi at Mānoa faculty
Indigenous writers of the Americas
20th-century American women writers
American women academics
Native Hawaiian academics